Craig Ireson (born in Manukau, New Zealand 1976) is a Wellington-based, New Zealand performance poet, also known as The Karaoke Poet.

Ireson is the organiser of the Wellington Word Collective, a community oriented collective of Wellington poets that produced the Wellington Word Festival (2003-2005) and Newtown Spoken Word, a Wellington Fringe Festival event. The Word Collective's only regular spoken word event is "Howltearoa", a monthly open mic night at the Southern Cross Bar, off Cuba Street, Wellington.

Ireson met Shane Hollands at the Thistle Hall, Wellington shortly before the first Word Festival in 2003 and invited Hollands back down to perform from Auckland. They found a common bond in their 'beat' styled writings and  Holland's Literatti, including Miriam Barr and Murray Haddow often travel to Wellington to perform  with the Word Collective.

Ireson wrote, produced and performed in two award winning poetry shows: the Sk8Board Poets;(Best of the Fringe-Wellington Fringe Festival 2004) and Karaoke Poetry (Best Spoken Word and Best of the Fringe-Wellington Fringe Festival 2005) Karaoke Poetry was first staged at BATS Theatre and reprised there in May 2005. A stripped back solo version was also performed at the National Library of New Zealand for their Main Trunk Lines Poetry Exhibition, July 2005.

In 2007 Ireson met the Belfast Touring Group at Howltearoa. They kept in contact and on the BGT's 2008 tour to Australia/New Zealand, Ireson and fellow Word Collective member Andy "the Pirate" Coombs opened for them at Happy bar.

References

https://web.archive.org/web/20081021072544/http://www.thebigidea.co.nz/modules.php?op=modload&name=Profile&file=index&func=showprofile&profileid=168
http://www.scoop.co.nz/stories/CU0602/S00209.htm
https://web.archive.org/web/20071030055328/http://www.thebigidea.co.nz/user.php?op=userinfo&uname=Wordcollective

1976 births
Living people
New Zealand poets
New Zealand male poets
New Zealand Youth MPs